is a former Japanese football player.

Playing career
Morita was born in Higashiyamato on October 28, 1984. After graduating from high school, he joined J1 League club Vegalta Sendai in 2003. However he could not play at all in the match behind Kiyomitsu Kobari and Daijiro Takakuwa. Although he moved to FC Tokyo in August 2005, he could not play at all in the match behind Yoichi Doi. In 2006, he moved to Japan Football League (JFL) club Sagawa Express Tokyo (later Sagawa Express, Sagawa Shiga). He became a regular goalkeeper and played many matches every seasons. However the club was disbanded end of 2012 season. He moved to JFL club SC Sagamihara and played many matches as regular goalkeeper. In 2014, he moved to newly was promoted to J2 League club, Kamatamare Sanuki. However he could not play many matches behind Takuya Seguchi. In 2015, he moved to newly was promoted to J3 League club, Renofa Yamaguchi FC. However he could hardly play in the match behind Jun Ichimori. He retired end of 2015 season.

Club statistics

References

External links

1984 births
Living people
People from Higashiyamato, Tokyo
Association football people from Tokyo Metropolis
Japanese footballers
J1 League players
J2 League players
J3 League players
Japan Football League players
Vegalta Sendai players
FC Tokyo players
Sagawa Shiga FC players
SC Sagamihara players
Kamatamare Sanuki players
Renofa Yamaguchi FC players
Association football goalkeepers